|}

The Sweet Solera Stakes is a Group 3 flat horse race in Great Britain open to two-year-old fillies. It is run on the July Course at Newmarket over a distance of 7 furlongs (1,408 metres), and it is scheduled to take place each year in August.

The event is named after Sweet Solera, the winner of the 1000 Guineas and Epsom Oaks in 1961. For a period it was classed at Listed level, and it was promoted to Group 3 status in 2004.

The leading horses from the Sweet Solera Stakes often go on to compete in the May Hill Stakes and the Fillies' Mile.

Records
Leading jockey since 1986 (4 wins):
 Michael Hills – Catwalk (1996), Peaceful Paradise (2000), Bay Tree (2003), English Ballet (2006)

Leading trainer since 1986 (5 wins):
 Mark Johnston - Jural (1994), Muraaqaba (2014), Main Edition (2018), West End Girl (2019), Lakota Sioux (2022)

Winners since 1986

See also
 Horse racing in Great Britain
 List of British flat horse races

References
 Racing Post:
 galopp-sieger.de – Sweet Solera Stakes.
 horseracingintfed.com – International Federation of Horseracing Authorities – Sweet Solera Stakes (2019).
 pedigreequery.com – Sweet Solera Stakes – Newmarket.

Flat races in Great Britain
Newmarket Racecourse
Flat horse races for two-year-old fillies